Ari Stidham (born August 22, 1992) is an American actor and musician. He is known for his role of statistical genius Sylvester Dodd in the television series Scorpion.

Early life
Stidham was born on August 22, 1992, in Westlake Village, California, to a Sephardic Jewish father and an Ashkenazi Jewish mother. His maternal grandparents were from Russia, and his paternal grandparents were from Morocco and the United States. He was raised in an observant Reform Jewish home, and he attended the Center for Early Jewish Education in Thousand Oaks. He does not identify as religiously Jewish, but he identifies as culturally Jewish.

Stidham began playing music at four and performed in theater and musical productions throughout elementary and high school. He later performed with and was a member of ComedySportz Los Angeles Improvisational comedy group.

Career 
Stidham broke into acting in 2010, with the character Ian in ABC Family television series Huge, based on a novel of the same name which centered around eight teenagers who had been sent to a weight loss camp. He later auditioned for the part of Sylvester Dodd in the CBS series Scorpion, despite the role being written for an African-American actor in his thirties, and was cast in the role after a single audition. From 2014 to 2018, Stidham was a part of the main cast for the all four seasons of the series (93 episodes).

He also releases music under the name DrTelevision, or DRTV. Additionally, through his production company Stidley Inc., he produces "short form alternative comedy" with Zach Green, including a monthly love comedy radio play Dick Duquesne: Tales of a Private Dick.

Stidham founded his company, Sanguinet Films, which was founded in 2016, with Ari at the helm as a producer, writer, and director of the company. He directed their flagship feature, Curse of the Siren, which premiered at Fangoria Fearcon in 2016.

In 2018, he played archvillain Grand Moff Levine in a musical stage spoof titled Solo Must Die: A Musical Parody. In October 2019, Stidham presented a comedy and musical celebration and re-telling of the Edgar Allan Poe's works titled The Edgar Allan Show. Re-enactments and recitals of 'The Raven', 'The Tell-Tale Heart' and 'The Fall of the House of Usher', were directed by and featured original songs by Stidham.

Filmography

Film

Television

References

External links 

 
 

1992 births
Living people
21st-century American male actors
American male film actors
American male television actors
Male actors from California
People from Westlake Village, California